Shri Lalhming Liana, a politician from Mizo National Front party, was a Member of the Parliament of India representing Mizoram in the Rajya Sabha, the upper house of the Parliament.

Education
He has completed his Bachelors in Education  at Government Aizawl College.

Career
He was first elected to Rajya Sabha in 2002 and then again re-elected in 2008 during Mizo National Front Government in Mizoram. He has been  involved in LTC scam and has been sentenced to 3 years imprisonment for forging air tickets to claim travel allowance.

See also
List of Rajya Sabha members from Mizoram

References

External links
 Profile on Rajya Sabha website

Mizo National Front politicians
Living people
Rajya Sabha members from Mizoram
Mizoram politicians
People from Aizawl district
1955 births
Mizo people